Network-enabled capability, or NEC, is the name given to the United Kingdom Ministry of Defence long-term intent to achieve enhanced military effect through the better use of information systems towards the goal of "right information, right place, right time – and not too much". NEC is envisaged as the coherent integration of sensors, decision-makers, effectors and support capabilities to achieve a more flexible and responsive military. This is intended to make commanders better aware of the evolving military situation and better able to react to events through  communications.

Allied parallels
NEC is related to the US concept of network-centric warfare (NCW), which at the time was described as "translating an information advantage into a decisive warfighting advantage". This was later renamed "network-centric operations" (NCO), to encompass activities such as peacekeeping.

NEC is related to the Australian concept of Ubiquitous Command and Control (UC2), which includes network-enabled capability, military intent, and awareness. UC2 extends the "networking position" of NEC and NCW to include positions on decision devolution, seeking the ubiquity of available decision makers and using computing to achieve it, the necessary human-computer integration in decision making, decentralisation of intent and physical dispersion, social coordination protocols to unify intent, capability and awareness, and management levels to bound behaviours.

See also
Networked swarming warfare
British Armed Forces
Skynet
Bowman

References
 Joint Services Publication 777 Edition 1, available online from the Ministry of Defence.
 Understanding Network Enabled Capability
 An Introductory Study to Cyber Security in NEC

External links
 BAE Systems NEC
 QinetiQ NEC
 Roke Manor Research NEC
 Systems Engineering & Assessment NEC
 Thales group NEC
 Ericsson white paper: C4ISR for Network-Oriented Defense
 NECE 2008
 Centric Labs

Net-centric